The 1917–18 season was the 45th season of competitive football in Scotland and the 28th season of the Scottish Football League. Division One was decreased from 20 to 18 clubs. Clydebank made their first appearance in the Scottish Football League.

Scottish Football League

Champions: Rangers

Scottish Cup
There was no Scottish Cup competition played.

Other honours

County

Junior Cup

Petershill were awarded the Junior Cup. No final tie was played.

Scotland national team

There were no Scotland matches played with the British Home Championship suspended due to World War I.

See also
1917–18 Rangers F.C. season
Association football during World War I

Notes and references

External links
Scottish Football Historical Archive

 
Seasons in Scottish football
Wartime seasons in Scottish football